Haesselia roraimensis is a species of liverwort in the family Cephaloziaceae. It is endemic to Guyana. Its natural habitat is on rotten logs in periodically flooded riverine forest from 550 and to 1,550 meters elevation, in the humid submontane tropical 'mossy' forests on the slopes of Mount Roraima, where the borders of Brazil, Venezuela, and Guyana meet.

References

Cephaloziaceae
Flora of Guyana
Vulnerable plants
Taxonomy articles created by Polbot
Flora of the Tepuis